American International Group, Inc. (AIG) is an American multinational finance and insurance corporation with operations in more than 80 countries and jurisdictions. , AIG companies employed 49,600 people. The company operates through three core businesses: General Insurance, Life & Retirement, and a standalone technology-enabled subsidiary. General Insurance includes Commercial, Personal Insurance, U.S. and International field operations. Life & Retirement includes Group Retirement, Individual Retirement, Life, and Institutional Markets.
AIG is a sponsor of the AIG Women's Open golf tournament.

AIG's corporate headquarters are in New York City and the company also has offices around the world. AIG serves 87% of the Fortune Global 500 and 83% of the Forbes 2000. AIG was ranked 60th on the 2018 Fortune 500 list. According to the 2016 Forbes Global 2000 list, AIG is the 87th largest public company in the world. On December 31, 2017, AIG had $65.2 billion in shareholder equity.

During the financial crisis of 2007–2008, the Federal Reserve bailed the company out for $180 billion and assumed controlling ownership stake, with the Financial Crisis Inquiry Commission correlating AIG's failure with the mass sales of unhedged insurance. AIG repaid $205 billion to the United States government in 2012.

History

1919–1945: Early years

AIG was founded December 19, 1919 when American Cornelius Vander Starr (1892–1968) established a general insurance agency, American Asiatic Underwriters (AAU), in Shanghai, China.  Business grew rapidly, and two years later, Starr formed a life insurance operation.  By the late 1920s, AAU had branches throughout China and Southeast Asia, including the Philippines, Indonesia, and Malaysia.  In 1926, Starr opened his first office in the United States, American International Underwriters Corporation (AIU).  He also focused on opportunities in Latin America and, in the late 1930s, AIU entered Havana, Cuba. The steady growth of the Latin American agencies proved significant as it would offset the decline in business from Asia due to the impending World War II. In 1939, Starr moved his headquarters from Shanghai, China, to New York City.

1945–1959: International and domestic expansion

After World War II, American International Underwriters (AIU) entered Japan and Germany, to provide insurance for American military personnel. Throughout the late 1940s and early 1950s, AIU continued to expand in Europe, with offices opening in France, Italy, and the United Kingdom. In 1952, Starr began to focus on the American market by acquiring Globe & Rutgers Fire Insurance Company and its subsidiary, American Home Fire Assurance Company.  By the end of the decade, C.V. Starr's general and life insurance organization included an extensive network of agents and offices in over 75 countries.

1959–1979: Reorganization and specialization

In 1960, C.V. Starr hired Maurice R. Greenberg, known as Hank, to develop an international accident and health business. Two years later, Greenberg reorganized one of C.V. Starr's U.S. holdings into a successful multiple line carrier. Greenberg focused on selling insurance through independent brokers rather than agents to eliminate agent salaries. Using brokers, AIU could price insurance according to its potential return even if it suffered decreased sales of certain products for great lengths of time with very little extra expense. In 1967, American International Group, Inc. (AIG) was incorporated as a unifying umbrella organization for most of C.V. Starr's general and life insurance businesses.  In 1968, Starr named Greenberg his successor. The company went public in 1969.

The 1970s presented many challenges for AIG as operations in the Middle East and Southeast Asia were curtailed or ceased altogether due to the changing political landscape. However, AIG continued to expand its markets by introducing specialized energy, transportation, and shipping products to serve the needs of niche industries.

1979–2000: New opportunities and directions

During the 1980s, AIG continued expanding its market distribution and worldwide network by offering a wide range of specialized products, including pollution liability and political risk.  In 1984, AIG listed its shares on the New York Stock Exchange (NYSE).  Throughout the 1990s, AIG developed new sources of income through diverse investments, including the acquisition of International Lease Finance Corporation (ILFC), a provider of leased aircraft to the airline industry.  In 1992, AIG received the first foreign insurance license granted in over 40 years by the Chinese government. Within the U.S., AIG acquired SunAmerica Inc. a retirement savings company managed by Eli Broad, in 1999.

2000–2012: Further expansion and decline

Growth

The early 2000s saw a marked period of growth as AIG acquired American General Corporation, a leading domestic life insurance and annuities provider, and AIG entered new markets including India. In February 2000, AIG created a strategic advisory venture team with the Blackstone Group and Kissinger Associates "to provide financial advisory services to corporations seeking high level independent strategic advice". AIG was an investor in Blackstone from 1998 to March 2012, when it sold all of its shares in the company. Blackstone acted as an adviser for AIG during the 2007–2008 financial crisis.

In March 2003 American General merged with Old Line Life Insurance Company.

In the early 2000s, AIG made significant investments in Russia as the country recovered from its financial crisis. In July 2003, Maurice Greenberg met with Putin to discuss AIG's investments and improving U.S.-Russia economic ties, in anticipation of Putin's meeting with U.S. President George W. Bush later that year."

In November 2004, AIG reached a $126 million settlement with the U.S. Securities and Exchange Commission and the Justice Department partly resolving a number of regulatory matters, and the company needed to continue to cooperate with investigators continuing to probe the sale of a non-traditional insurance product.

Accounting scandal

In 2005, AIG became embroiled in a series of fraud investigations conducted by the Securities and Exchange Commission, U.S. Justice Department, and New York State Attorney General's Office. Greenberg was ousted amid an accounting scandal in February 2005. The New York Attorney General's investigation led to a $1.6 billion fine for AIG and criminal charges for some of its executives.

On May 1, 2005, investigations conducted by outside counsel at the request of AIG's Audit Committee and the consultation with AIG's independent auditors, PricewaterhouseCoopers LLP resulted in AIG's decision to restate its financial statements for the years ended December 31, 2003, 2002, 2001 and 2000, the quarters ended March 31, June 30 and September 30, 2004, and 2003 and the quarter ended December 31, 2003.
On November 9, 2005, the company was said to have delayed its third-quarter earnings report because it had to restate earlier financial results, to correct accounting errors.

Expansion to the credit default insurance market

Martin J. Sullivan became CEO of the company in 2005. He began his career at AIG as a clerk in its London office in 1970. AIG then took on tens of billions of dollars of risk associated with mortgages. It insured tens of billions of dollars of derivatives against default, but did not purchase reinsurance to hedge that risk. Secondly, it used collateral on deposit to buy mortgage-backed securities. When losses hit the mortgage market in 2007–2008, AIG had to pay out insurance claims and also replace the losses in its collateral accounts.

AIG purchased the remaining 39% that it did not own of online auto insurance specialist 21st Century Insurance in 2007 for $749 million. With the failure of the parent company and the continuing recession in late 2008, AIG rebranded its insurance unit to 21st Century Insurance.

On June 11, 2008, three stockholders, collectively owning 4% of the outstanding stock of AIG, delivered a letter to the Board of Directors of AIG seeking to oust CEO Martin Sullivan and make certain other management and Board of Directors changes. This letter was the latest volley in what The Wall Street Journal called a "public spat" between the company's board and management on one hand, and its key stockholders and former CEO Maurice Greenberg on the other hand.

On June 15, 2008, after disclosure of financial losses and subsequent to a falling stock price, Sullivan resigned and was replaced by Robert B. Willumstad, Chairman of the AIG Board of Directors since 2006. Willumstad was forced by the US government to step down and was replaced by Ed Liddy on September 17, 2008. AIG's board of directors named Bob Benmosche CEO on August 3, 2009, to replace Liddy, who earlier in the year announced his retirement.

2008 liquidity crisis and government bailout

In late 2008, the federal government bailed out AIG for $180 billion, and technically assumed control, because many believed its failure would endanger the financial integrity of other major firms that were its trading partners--Goldman Sachs, Morgan Stanley, Bank of America and Merrill Lynch, as well as dozens of European banks. In January 2011, the Financial Crisis Inquiry Commission issued one of many critical governmental reports, deciding that AIG failed and was rescued by the government primarily because its enormous sales of credit default swaps were made without putting up the initial collateral, setting aside capital reserves, or hedging its exposure, which one analyst considered a profound failure in corporate governance, particularly its risk management practices. Other analysts believed AIG's failure was possible because of the sweeping deregulation of over-the-counter (OTC) derivatives, including credit default swaps, which effectively eliminated federal and state regulation of these products, including capital and margin requirements that would have lessened the likelihood of AIG's failure.

Illustrating the danger of an AIG bankruptcy, a September 17, 2008, CNN Money article stated, "But in AIG's case, the situation is even more serious. The company is much larger and complex than Lehman Brothers and its assets hitting the market all at once would likely cause worldwide chaos and send values plummeting. Experts question whether there are even enough qualified buyers out there to digest the company and its subsidiaries."

AIG had sold credit protection through its London unit in the form of credit default swaps (CDSs) on collateralized debt obligations (CDOs) but by 2008, they had declined in value.  AIG's Financial Products division, headed by Joseph Cassano in London, had entered into credit default swaps to insure $441 billion worth of securities originally rated AAA. Of those securities, $57.8 billion were structured debt securities backed by subprime loans. As a result, AIG's credit rating was downgraded and it was required to post additional collateral with its trading counter-parties, leading to a liquidity crisis that began on September 16, 2008, and essentially bankrupted all of AIG. The New York United States Federal Reserve Bank (led by Timothy Geithner who would later become Treasury secretary) stepped in, announcing creation of a secured credit facility, initially of up to $85 billion to prevent the company's collapse, enabling AIG to deliver additional collateral to its credit default swap trading partners. The credit facility was secured by the stock in AIG-owned subsidiaries in the form of warrants for a 79.9% equity stake in the company and the right to suspend dividends to previously issued common and preferred stock. The AIG board accepted the terms of the Federal Reserve rescue package that same day, making it the largest government bailout of a private company in U.S. history.

In March 2009, AIG compounded public cynicism concerning the "too big to fail" firm's bailout by announcing that it would pay its executives over $165 million in executive bonuses. Total bonuses for the financial unit could reach $450 million, and bonuses for the entire company could reach $1.2 billion. Newly inaugurated President Barack Obama, who had voted for TARP as a Senator responded to the planned payments by saying "[I]t's hard to understand how derivative traders at AIG warranted any bonuses, much less $165 million in extra pay. How do they justify this outrage to the taxpayers who are keeping the company afloat?" Both Democratic and Republican politicians reacted with similar outrage to the planned bonuses, as did political commentators and journalists in the AIG bonus payments controversy.

AIG began selling some assets to pay off its government loans in September 2008 despite a global decline in the valuation of insurance businesses, and the weakening financial condition of potential bidders. In December 2009, AIG formed international life insurance subsidiaries, American International Assurance Company, Limited (AIA) and American Life Insurance Company (ALICO), which were transferred to the Federal Reserve Bank of New York, to reduce its debt by $25 billion. AIG sold its Hartford Steam Boiler unit on March 31, 2009, to Munich Re for $742 million. On April 16, 2009, AIG announced plans to sell its 21st Century Insurance subsidiary to Farmers Insurance Group for $1.9 billion. In June 2009 AIG sold its majority ownership of reinsurer Transatlantic Re. The Wall Street Journal reported on September 7, 2009, that Pacific Century Group had agreed to pay $500 million for a part of AIG's asset management business, and that they also expected to pay an additional $200 million to AIG in carried interest and other payments linked to future performance of the business.

AIG then sold its American Life Insurance Co. (ALICO) to MetLife Inc. for $15.5 billion in cash and MetLife stock in March 2010. Bloomberg L.P. reported on March 29, 2010, that after almost three months of delays, AIG had completed the $500 million sale of a portion of its asset management business, branded PineBridge Investments, to the Asia-based Pacific Century Group. Fortress Investment Group purchased 80% of the interest in financing company American General Finance in August 2010. In September 2010 AIG sold AIG Starr and AIG Edison, two of its Japan-based companies, to Prudential Financial for $4.2 billion in cash and $600 million in assumption of third party AIG debt by Prudential. On November 1, 2010, AIG raised $36.71 billion from both the sale of ALICO and its IPO of AIA. Proceeds went to repay some of the aid it received from the government during the financial crisis.

AIG sold its Taiwanese life insurance company Nan Shan Life to a consortium of buyers for $2.16 billion in January 2011. Due to the Q3 2011 net loss widening, on November 3, 2011, AIG shares plunged 49 percent year to date. The insurer's board approved a share buyback of as much as $1 billion.

Nine years after the initial bailout, in 2017, the U.S. Financial Stability Oversight Council removed AIG from its list of too-big-to-fail institutions.

2012–2016: Modern era
The United States Department of the Treasury announced an offering of 188.5 million shares of AIG for a total of $5.8 billion on May 7, 2012. The sale reduced Treasury's stake in AIG to 61 percent, from 70 percent before the transaction. Four months later, on September 6, 2012, AIG sold $2 billion of its investment in AIA to repay government loans. The board also approved a $5 billion stock repurchase of government-owned shares in AIA. The next week, on September 14, 2012, the Department of Treasury completed its fifth sale of AIG common stock, with proceeds of approximately $20.7 billion, reducing the Treasury's ownership stake in AIG to approximately 15.9 percent from 53 percent. Government commitments were fully recovered, and Treasury and the FRBNY to date had received a combined positive return of approximately $15.1 billion.

On October 12, 2012, AIG announced a five and a half year agreement to sponsor six New Zealand-based rugby teams, including the world champion All Blacks. The AIG logo and the Adidas logo, the league's primary sponsor, were displayed on the league's team jerseys.

The U.S. Department of the Treasury in December 2012 published an itemized list of the loans, stock purchases, special purpose vehicles (SPVs) and other investments engaged in with AIG, the amount AIG paid back and the positive return on the loans and investments to the government. The Treasury said that it and the Federal Reserve Bank of New York provided a total $182.3 billion to AIG, which paid back a total $205 billion, for a total positive return, or profit, to the government of $22.7 billion. In addition, AIG sold off a number of its own assets to raise money to pay back the government. On December 14, 2012, the Treasury Department sold the last of its AIG stock in its sixth stock sale for a total of approximately $7.6 billion. In total, the Treasury Department realized a gain of more than $22 billion from the sale of AIG common stock and $0.9 billion from the sale of AIG preferred stock. The same month, Robert Benmosche announced that he would be stepping down from his position as president and CEO due to his advancing lung cancer.

AIG began an advertising campaign on January 1, 2013, called "Thank You America," in which several company employees, including AIG President and CEO Robert Benmosche, talked directly to the camera and offered their thanks for the government assistance. Peter Hancock succeeded Benmosche as president and CEO of AIG in September 2014. While Benmosche stayed on in an advisory role, he died in February the following year.

In June 2015, Taiwan's Nan Shan Life Insurance acquired a stake in AIG's subsidiary in Taiwan for a fee of $158 million. Later that year, activist investor Carl Icahn called for a breakup of AIG, describing the company as "too big to succeed". AIG announced plans for an initial public offering of 19.9 percent of United Guaranty Corp., a Greensboro, North Carolina-based provider of mortgage insurance for lenders in January 2016. Later that year, Icahn won a seat on the board of directors and continued to pressure the company to split up its major divisions. AIG also began a joint venture with Hamilton Insurance Group and Two Sigma Investments to serve the insurance needs of small- to medium-sized enterprises. Industry veteran Brian Duperreault became the chairman of the new entity, and Richard Friesenhahn, the executive vice president of U.S. casualty lines at AIG, became CEO. In August 2016, AIG sold off United Guaranty, its mortgage-guarantee unit, to Arch Capital Group, a Bermuda-based insurer, for $3.4 billion.

2017
Brian Duperreault was appointed CEO of AIG on May 15, 2017. Duperreault, who previously worked at AIG from 1973 until 1994, was hired as CEO from Hamilton Insurance Group following Hancock's announcement in March 2017 that he would step down as AIG CEO under pressure after a period of disappointing financial results. Due to previous calls in 2015 and 2016 to shrink or break up AIG, Duperreault announced his intention to grow AIG and maintain its multiline structure as a provider of life and retirement solutions and non-life insurance, outlining a strategy to focus on technology, "underwriting discipline," and diversification.

2017 through early 2019 saw AIG hire a number of new upper level executives, including 125 senior underwriters and most of Duperreault's direct subordinates. In 2017, Duperreault named his former Marsh & McLennan Companies colleagues Lucy Fato as General Counsel and Peter Zaffino as AIG COO, later also naming him CEO of AIG's General Insurance business. Zaffino succeeded Duperreault as president of AIG in January 2020, with Duperreault remaining AIG's CEO. The company announced plans in 2017 to reorganize its Commercial and Consumer segments into General Insurance and Life & Retirement, respectively. In September 2017, the Financial Stability Oversight Council determined that AIG was no longer considered a nonbank systemically important financial institution (SIFI). Duperreault commented in response that the development reflected "the progress made since 2008 to de-risk the company."

2018–2021
AIG made a number of acquisitions in 2018. That July, AIG acquired Validus Holdings Ltd., a provider of reinsurance based in Bermuda. The company was also a Lloyd's of London syndicate, involved in insurance-linked securities, a specialist in US small commercial excess and surplus underwriting, and a provider of crop insurance. The deal "brought in fresh underwriting talent," particularly in property risk and catastrophe risk. Also in 2018 AIG acquired Ellipse, a UK life insurance business, from Munich Re. In 2018, AIG established Fortitude Re to hold most of its run-off portfolios and late in 2018 sold a minority stake to The Carlyle Group. In November 2019, a Carlyle-managed fund and T&D Holdings acquired a majority interest in Fortitude Re, leaving AIG with a 3.5% stake "subject to required regulatory approvals and other customary closing conditions."

Duperreault and Zaffino set out a turnaround strategy for the General Insurance business in 2017 and began execution. In 2019, Duperreault stated that the new executive team had restructured the business, implemented new risk and underwriting guidelines, and "overhauled its reinsurance buying strategy." In 2019, AIG signed a five-year contract to be the title sponsor of Women's British Open, its first deal in golf. In 2020, the contract was extended to 2025 and the championship was rebranded as the AIG Women's Open, with the largest LPGA major women's prize fund in 2021, totaling $US5.8 million.

In August 2019, Duperreault and Zaffino announced "AIG 200", a multi-year program to improve operations by shedding legacy processes and excess manual interventions, modernizing and digitizing workflows, and unifying operations. Also during that month, AIG reported its second consecutive quarter of underwriting profits, and AIG's Life and Retirement business, led by CEO Kevin Hogan, delivered "solid growth" and returns despite a volatile credit and equity market. In January 2020, AIG announced it was ending its decade-long sponsorship of the All Blacks in 2021. On March 1, 2021, Peter Zaffino succeeded Brian Duperreault as AIG's CEO, with Duperreault becoming executive chairman of the board. As part of AIG's 2020 plan to form an independent company of its life and retirement insurance business with a 2022 IPO, the company announced, in July 2021, that Blackstone Group would acquire 9.9% of the new unit for $2.2 billion cash. Blackstone and AIG also entered a long-term asset management agreement for about one quarter of AIG's life and retirement portfolio, set to increase in subsequent years. After the spin-off, Corebridge Financial became an independent entity.

Business 
In Australia and China, AIG is identified as a large financial institution and provider of financial services including credit security mechanisms. In the United States, AIG is the largest underwriter of commercial and industrial insurance.

AIG offers property casualty insurance, life insurance, retirement products, mortgage insurance and other financial services. In the third quarter of 2012, the global property-and-casualty insurance business, Chartis, was renamed AIG Property Casualty.  SunAmerica, life-insurance and retirement-services division, was renamed AIG Life and Retirement; other existing brands continue to be used in certain geographies and market segments.

Sponsorships 
AIG was the shirt sponsor of the English football club Manchester United F.C. between 2006 and 2010. AIG was the first American shirt sponsor of the club and AIG shirts were worn for one of the most concentrated periods of success in the club’s history, coinciding with Sir Alex Ferguson’s third great United team, which won three Premier League titles, as well as the Champions League, in the space of four seasons.

Subsidiaries

 AIG Europe S.A.
American General Life Insurance Company
American Home Assurance Company
Lexington Insurance Company
National Union Fire Insurance Company of Pittsburgh, PA
The United States Life Insurance Company in the City of New York
The Variable Annuity Life Insurance Company (VALIC)
American International Group UK Ltd.
AIG General Insurance Co. Ltd.
Validus Reinsurance, Ltd.

Bailout litigation 

 Starr International Co v U.S. Federal Circuit Court of Appeals
Hank Greenberg, with lead lawyer David Boies, independently sued the U.S. Government for money damages in the United States Court of Federal Claims in 2011. The AIG board had announced on January 9 that the company would not join the lawsuit. After hearing thirty-seven days of testimony from Ben Bernanke, Timothy Geithner, Hank Paulson and others, Judge Thomas C. Wheeler ruled that the Federal Reserve payment to AIG had been an illegal exaction, as the Federal Reserve Act did not authorize the New York Fed to nationalize a corporation by owning its stock. Judge Wheeler did not award compensation to the plaintiffs, ruling that they did not suffer economic damage because "if the government had done nothing, the shareholders would have been left with 100 percent of nothing."

Greenberg and the U.S. Government appealed to the Court of Appeals for the Federal Circuit, which ruled that Greenberg had no legal right to challenge the bailout because that right belonged to AIG, which in this case, chose not to sue.
 AIG Inc. et al. v. Maiden Lane II LLC
AIG filed suit against the Federal Reserve Bank of New York in January 2013 in order to maintain the former's right to sue Bank of America and other issuers of bad mortgage debt. The specific issue was whether the Federal Reserve Bank of New York transferred $18 billion in litigation claims on troubled mortgage debt through Maiden Lane Transactions, entities created by the Fed in 2008. This transaction, AIG argued, prevented them from recouping losses from insured banks. Owing to events which allowed AIG to proceed in another related case, AIG Inc. v. Bank of America Corporation LLC, AIG withdrew the Maiden Lane case "without prejudice" on May 28, 2013.
 AIG Inc. v. Bank of America Corporation LLC
On May 7, 2013, Los Angeles U.S. District Judge, Mariana Pfaelzer, ruled in a case between AIG and Bank of America concerning possible misrepresentations by Merrill Lynch and Countrywide as to the quality of the mortgage portfolio, that $7.3 billion of the disputed claims had not been assigned. The two parties settled in July 2014, with Bank of America paying out $650 million to AIG, who in turn dismissed their litigation.

Corporate governance

Board of directors
In December 2022, the AIG board includes:
Paola Bergamaschi - Former executive at State Street, Credit Suisse and Goldman Sachs
James Cole Jr. – Chairman and CEO, The Jasco Group
John Rice - Former vice chairman of GE, former president and CEO of the GE Global Growth Organization
W. Don Cornwell – Former chairman and CEO, Granite Broadcasting Corporation
William G. Jurgensen – Former CEO, Nationwide Insurance
Linda A. Mills – Former vice president of operations, Northrop Grumman Corporation
Thomas F. Motamed – Former chairman and CEO, CNA Financial Corporation
Peter R. Porrino – Former executive vice president and CFO, XL Group Ltd
Douglas Steenland – Former president and CEO, Northwest Airlines Corporation
Therese M. Vaughn – Former CEO, the National Association of Insurance Commissioners
Peter Zaffino – Chairman and CEO, AIG

See also

 Bailout
 Late-2000s financial crisis
 List of United States insurance companies

References

Further reading
 
 
 
  (Graphic)
 "Losses in Perspective" New York Times. September 17, 2008. (Graphic of AIG quarterly net profit & losses over five years, comparing Finance vs. Insurance activities.)
 
  (Graphic and interactive timeline.)
 
 
 For a list of counterparties receiving U.S. taxpayer dollars, see: Business Week – List of Counterparties and Payouts

External links

  – official site

 
Life insurance companies of the United States
Reinsurance companies
Companies based in Manhattan
Financial services companies based in New York City
Holding companies based in New York City
Insurance companies based in New York City
Multinational companies based in New York City
Publicly traded companies based in New York City
American companies established in 1919
Financial services companies established in 1919
Holding companies established in 1919
Chinese companies established in 1919
1960s initial public offerings
Companies listed on the New York Stock Exchange
Former components of the Dow Jones Industrial Average
Subprime mortgage crisis